Formed in 1886 on the Lake Erie Island of Kelley's Island, Ohio, the Kelley Island Lime & Transport Company was also known by its initials, KIL&T. It was once the world's largest producer of limestone and lime.   The firm began quarry operations on Kelley's Island in 1886 and was dissolved in the early 1960s.

Company operations were located in Ohio, New York, and West Virginia.  Main sites were Kelley's Island (1886-1940) and nearby Marblehead, Ohio (1890s-1955). In 1922, KIL&T built the world's largest stone crushing plant at Marblehead. It also owned many lime kilns and produced lime products.

The company operated  gauge Shay steam locomotives to move raw stone around its quarries until World War II. KIL&T purchased 65 new Shays from the Lima Locomotive Works (Lima, Ohio) over the years.

Shay Locomotives

Notes

References

See also 
 Lakeside and Marblehead Railroad

Defunct mining companies of the United States
Mining railways in the United States
Industrial railroads in the United States
3 ft gauge railways in the United States
Defunct companies based in Ohio
Defunct Ohio railroads
1886 establishments in Ohio
Limestone industry
Kelleys Island, Ohio